Stan Hedwall Park is the largest park in Chehalis, Washington at 204-acres (83 ha). It is located west of I-5, and southeast of Lintott-Alexander Park and the beginning trailhead for the Willapa Hills Trail. The park contains ball fields for softball and little league baseball, areas for volleyball and soccer, RV parking, and three miles of trails. The Newaukum River winds thru the forested, southern portion of the park and the river is accessible to visitors for fishing and water activities.

The park is named after a former Chehalis parks director and Lewis County commissioner. The ballfields host competitions for the Babe Ruth League and various high school sports in Lewis County, acting as home field for W.F. West High School.

The land was originally owned by Washington’s Department of Social and Health Services, making it state property.  It was used as farmland maintained by students at the Green Hill School. A 55-year agreement to lease the area to Chehalis began in 1972 and continued for decades. A park began to be built that year in part from a grant by Washington's Interagency Committee for Outdoor Recreation. After various attempts to purchase the park, the city succeeded in January 2014 when an accommodation was made by the state to list the land as surplus and transfer, by deed, ownership to Chehalis for zero dollars.

See also
Parks and Recreation in Chehalis, Washington

References 

Parks in Lewis County, Washington